Moss & Pentre railway station was a station in Brynteg, Wrexham, Wales. The station was opened on 1 August 1889 and closed on 1 March 1917.

References

Disused railway stations in Wrexham County Borough
Railway stations in Great Britain opened in 1889
Railway stations in Great Britain closed in 1917
Former Great Central Railway stations